Antennarius pardalis, known as the leopard frogfish, is a species of fish in the family Antennariidae. It is native to the Eastern Atlantic from Senegal to the Republic of the Congo, including Cape Verde. It is found at a depth range of 18 to 50 m (59 to 164 ft) and reaches 10.2 cm (4 inches) SL. It is a coastal species that can be seen in marine or occasionally brackish environments, and it feeds on shrimp and small fish.

References 

Antennariidae
Fish described in 1837
Fish of the Atlantic Ocean
Taxa named by Achille Valenciennes